Elvy Musikka (born August 10, 1939) is an American cannabis rights activist.

Life and activism 
Elvy Musikka, who grew up in Hollywood, Florida, is one of three surviving patients enrolled in the Compassionate Investigational New Drug Program, getting marijuana from the federal government.

Musikka, who uses cannabis to fight glaucoma in her left eye after going blind in her right eye despite having surgery, was arrested for growing marijuana in 1988. At her trial, Musikka's doctor testified and she was acquitted. She applied and was approved to get legal cannabis cigarettes later that year.

Musikka resides in Eugene, Oregon, and serves on the board of advisors of Voter Power.

Awards and recognition 
Musikka was named High Times magazine's 1992 Freedom Fighter of the Year at the Cannabis Cup in Amsterdam.

References

1939 births
Living people
American cannabis activists
People from Eugene, Oregon
Place of birth missing (living people)